The 2017–18 Hong Kong Second Division League was the 4th season of Hong Kong Second Division since it became the third-tier football league in Hong Kong in 2014–15. The season began on 3 September 2017 and ended on 13 May 2018.

Teams

Changes from last season

From Second Division
Promoted to First Division
 Sparta Rotterdam (Mutual)
 Hoi King

Relegated to Third Division
 Kwok Keung
 Tuen Mun FC

To Second Division
Relegated from First Division
 Kwai Tsing
 Yau Tsim Mong

Promoted from Third Division
 Happy Valley
 Fu Moon
 GFC Friends
 Fukien

League table

References

Hong Kong Second Division League seasons
2017–18 in Hong Kong football